National Road 74 (abbreviated as EO74) is a single carriageway road in southern Greece. It connects Pyrgos with Tripoli, via Olympia and Vytina. It runs through the western and central part of the Peloponnese peninsula, in the regional units Elis and Arcadia.

Route
The western terminus of the GR-74 is in Pyrgos, where it branches off the GR-9. On its way east, it follows the Alfeios valley past Olympia until Tripotamia, where it starts following the river Ladon upstream. Near Kalliani it turns east again. It passes through mountainous northern Arcadia, through the towns Vytina and Levidi. It ends at Tripoli, where it is connected with the GR-7 and the GR-39.

National Road 74 passes through the following places:

Pyrgos
Varvasaina
Olympia (bypass)
Koskinas
Vasilaki
Tripotamia 
Kalliani
Lefkochori
Lagkadia
Karkalou
Vytina
Vlacherna
Levidi
Kapsas
Tripoli

74
Roads in Peloponnese (region)
Roads in Western Greece